Wersäll is a Swedish surname that may refer to:

Claës Wersäll (1848–1919), Swedish Finance Minister
Charlotta Wersäll (1858–1924), wife of Claes, who received a special gold medal at the 1912 Olympics
Claës-Axel Wersäll (1888–1951), Swedish Olympic gymnast, son of Claes and Charlotta
Gustaf Wersäll (1887–1973), Swedish modern pentathlete, son of Claes and Charlotta, brother of Claes-Axel
Ture Wersäll (1883–1965), Swedish Olympic tug of war competitor, son of Claes and Charlotta, brother of Claes-Axel and Gustaf

Swedish-language surnames